John Morrison was a Tyneside songwriter from the early nineteenth century.

Details 
Thomas Allan in his 1891 version of  Allan's Illustrated Edition of Tyneside Songs and Readings states that "Of the author we have no trace. Evidently a Sheels man, he contrives to cap Thompson, who, in making "Canny Newcassel" marrow 
the "Streets o' Lunnin" had not done amiss".

The only two works of his which seem to have survived are :
Canny Sheels – showing that London compares poorly with Shields.
Permanent Yeast – about the "new-fangled yeast" which no longer explodes – as in the advertisement of the day "Mr. Mawson’s ‘German Dried’ for me".

The author's name and his "Canny Sheels" first appeared in Davidson of Alnwick's "Collection of Tyneside Songs" published in 1840. Both songs appear in Fordyce’s "The Tyne Songster" published in 1840. Again both songs appear in "Songs of the Bards of the Tyne" published by P. France & Co. in 1850, although he erroneously credits the authorship of "Canny Shields" to "J Morris" in the front index section.
Thomas Allan in his 1891 version of  "Allan's Illustrated Edition of Tyneside Songs and Readings" publishes details of "Canny Sheels" only but refers to "Permanent Yeast" as being a second song by him "but it is much inferior to the first".

Both songs are written in the Geordie dialect.

See also 					
Geordie dialect words				
The Tyne Songster (W & T Fordyce, 1840)				
W & T Fordyce (publishers)
France's Songs of the Bards of the Tyne - 1850
P. France & Co.
Joseph Philip Robson<br/ >
Thomas Allan (publisher)<br/ >
Allan's Illustrated Edition of Tyneside Songs and Readings

References

External links
 The Tyne Songster by W & T Fordyce 1840
 Songs of the Bards of the Tyne

English songwriters
People from Newcastle upon Tyne (district)
Musicians from Tyne and Wear
People from South Shields
Writers from Tyne and Wear
Geordie songwriters